Fortrose  is a town and former royal burgh in Highland, Scotland, United Kingdom. The burgh is a popular location for trying to spot bottlenose dolphins (see Chanonry Point) in the Moray Firth. The town is known for its ruined 13th century cathedral, and as the home of the Brahan Seer.

The correct pronunciation of the town's name in accordance with local usage is with the stress on the first syllable.

Prehistory 
Archaeological investigations, by Headland Archaeology, in 2013, as part of a planning condition for the creation of a housing development found domestic activity dating from the Neolithic to the Early Bronze Age. There was evidence of cereal production and the gathering of wild resources. The archaeologists also found that funerary practices change on the peninsula during that time from stone cist burials to cremation burials.

History 
In the Middle Ages it was the seat of the bishopric of Ross, and formerly called Chanonry, for being the Chanory of Ross.  Fortrose owes its origins to the decision by Bishop Robert in the 13th century to build a new Cathedral of Ross there. This was to replace the Church of St Peter in nearby Rosemarkie. The cathedral was largely demolished in the mid-seventeenth century by Oliver Cromwell to provide building materials for a citadel at Inverness.  The vaulted south aisle, with bell-tower, and a detached chapter house (used as the tollbooth of Fortrose after the Reformation) remain.  These fragments, though modest in scale, display considerable architectural refinement, and are in the care of Historic Scotland (no entrance charge).

Etymology 
The name Fortrose may conserve the ethonym Fortriu, and may be derived from the phrase "ros (headland) of Fortriu", referring to nearby Chanonry Point.

Parliamentary burgh
Fortrose was a parliamentary burgh, combined with Inverness, Forres and Nairn, in the Inverness Burghs constituency of the House of Commons of the Parliament of Great Britain from 1708 to 1801 and of the Parliament of the United Kingdom from 1801 to 1918.  The constituency was abolished in 1918 and the Fortrose component was merged into the then new constituency of Ross and Cromarty.

Fortrose Academy
Fortrose Academy is the only secondary school on the Black Isle. There are around 640 pupils enrolled.  Notable former teachers include Mr A. Tait, who won the Teacher of the Year Award in Scotland, 2006. The rector of the school is Gavin Maclean.

Fortrose Library
Built into the school is Fortrose library, which is part of the Highland Libraries group. The library is regularly used by pupils in Fortrose Academy, for which the younger years take out books to participate in the "power readers" scheme, which involves pupils getting rewards for reading a certain number of books, and passing on to the next level. Due to the library's small size, the stock is always changing.

Black Isle Leisure Centre
Situated next to the school is the Black Isle Leisure Centre. It consists of a gym, and one single indoor court which has space for four badminton courts, four small basketball courts or one full sized basketball court. It also has goals at either end for football. Pupils of Fortrose Academy regularly have PE lessons in the Leisure Centre.

Transport
The A832 runs through the town.

There is a bus service from Inverness that runs half-hourly weekdays (with a few gaps for schools traffic). The buses continue hourly to Cromarty.

There was a railway station at Fortrose, which closed in 1951. The line it was situated on closed in 1960.

People from Fortrose
 Eliza Junor

References

Further reading
Bond, Elizabeth (1814) Letters of a Village Governess. 2 vols. London: printed for the Author, by E. Blackader

External links

 Fortrose & Rosemarkie Golf Club
 Northern Lighthouse Board - Chanonry Point
  Chanonry Sailing Club
 Fortrose Union Football Club
  The Anderson restaurant with rooms
 Engraving of Fortrose in 1693 by John Slezer at National Library of Scotland

 
Towns in Highland (council area)
Populated places on the Black Isle